Vincenzo Carnevali (1779-1842) was an Italian painter and scenic designer.

Biography 
He was born in Reggio Emilia, and also trained in Milan. He helped decorate the Palazzo Spalletti-Trivelli in  the historic center of Reggio Emilia. He worked with the engineer Giovanni Paglia in the Teatro di Reggio Emilia. One of his pupils was Antonio Fontanesi.

References

19th-century Italian painters
Italian male painters
1779 births
1842 deaths
Italian scenic designers
19th-century Italian male artists